Robert B. Taylor (March 24, 1774  – April 13, 1834) was a nineteenth-century American lawyer and militia Brigadier General from Virginia.

Early life
Taylor was born in Williamsburg, Virginia and graduated from the College of William and Mary in 1793. While at College, he fought a duel with John Randolph of Roanoke.

Career

As an adult, Taylor lived in Norfolk, Virginia and was elected to the House of Delegates from 1796 to 1800.

Appointed by the General Assembly as a Brigadier General of state militia, Taylor served in the defense of Norfolk 1813-1814 during the War of 1812; he was appointed to the same rank in the U.S. army, but declined.

In 1829, Taylor was elected to the Virginia Constitutional Convention of 1829-1830. He was chosen by the Convention to serve on the Committee on the Judicial Department, but he resigned on ascertaining that his views on enfranchisement and apportionment did not align with his constituency. He was one of four delegates elected from the western senatorial district made up his home district of the Borough of Norfolk, and Norfolk, Princess Anne, and Nansemond Counties. He was replaced by Hugh Blair Grigsby.

Taylor served on the Virginia General Court from 1831 until his death.

Death
Robert B. Taylor died on April 13, 1834 in Norfolk, Virginia.

References

Bibliography

Members of the Virginia House of Delegates
Politicians from Norfolk, Virginia

1774 births

1834 deaths